Rocky River is a stream in north Queensland.

References

Rivers of Queensland